Zinc finger protein 91 homolog is a protein that in humans is encoded by the ZFP91 gene.

The protein encoded by this gene is a member of the zinc finger family of proteins. The gene product contains C2H2 type domains, which are the classical zinc finger domains found in numerous nucleic acid-binding proteins. In addition to the monocistronic transcript originating from this locus, a co-transcribed variant composed of ZFP91 and CNTF sequence has been identified. The monocistronic and co-transcribed variants encode distinct isoforms. The co-transcription of ZFP91 and CNTF has also been observed in mouse.

References

Further reading